Tours Speedway is an oval speedway located in Tours, France. The track is located at the parkingplace of the Parc des expositions east of the city. It was first used in 2012. The only event raced on the track is the NASCAR Whelen Euro Series.

On October, 2nd, Tours announced that the 2018 NASCAR Whelen Euro Series race will be the last NASCAR race in this track.

Race results

External links
NASCAR Whelen Euro Series homepage

NASCAR tracks
Defunct motorsport venues in France
Sport in Tours, France
Sports venues in Indre-et-Loire
2012 establishments in France